The SV Tenacious is a modern British wooden sail training ship, specially designed in the 1990s. When completed in 2000, it was the largest wooden ship to be built in the UK for over 100 years.

The ship was built by the Jubilee Sailing Trust (JST) and, along with the STS Lord Nelson, the pair are the only tall ships in the world that were built so that both disabled and non-disabled people can sail as crew, not passengers. Features that cannot be found on other ships include wheelchair lifts throughout, unique ascender systems that allow wheelchair users to go aloft (either assisted or by their own efforts), a speaking compass for those with visual impairments, hearing loops, adjustable furniture for those with mobility difficulties, and a joystick to help individuals with dexterity limitations to steer the ship. Everyone plays a full and active role in the voyage. The JST are a UN accredited charity offering sailing adventures to people of all abilities and backgrounds.

History 
Launched in 2000, Sailing Vessel Tenacious is the largest wooden tall ship built in the United Kingdom in the last 100 years. It is 65 metres (213.25 feet) long including bowsprit, and it is rigged as a (three-masted) barque with two mizzen gaffs. Its deck is 49.85 metres long, its hull is 54.02 metres long, and it has a beam of 10.6 metres at its widest point. A press release from the Belfast Maritime Festival on 22 June 2006 announced that the Tenacious was "the largest wooden ship still afloat".

Tenacious displaces about 714 tons (summer draft). Its maiden voyage was on 1 September 2000 from Southampton to Southampton calling at Sark, St Helier and Weymouth. The ship is owned by a UK-based charity, the Jubilee Sailing Trust, which also owns the 42-metre-long tall ship STS Lord Nelson (length including bowsprit is 55 metres and waterline length is 37 metres).

Tenacious featured in the first series of Channel 5's Sea Patrol UK, when one of the crew members had fallen ill and needed to be winched into an RAF Westland Sea King and taken to hospital. Due to the height of the masts and rigging, this posed a challenge to the helicopter's pilot and winch crew but the rescue attempt was successful and the crew member survived a potentially fatal condition.

References

External links
 Official website

2000 ships
Accessible transportation
Disabled boating
Tall ships of the United Kingdom
Individual sailing vessels
Barques
Sail training ships
Ships built in Southampton